Roman Kupchinsky (Vienna, November 1, 1944 - Washington D.C., January 19, 2010) served as a correspondent for RFE/RL and was director of Radio Liberty in Ukraine.

References

External links
Acus.org
Rferl.org

1944 births
2010 deaths
American male journalists
Radio Free Europe/Radio Liberty people